George Francis Margitich (18 November 1908 – 17 January 1958) was an Australian rules footballer who played with Melbourne in the Victorian Football League (VFL) during the 1930s.

Football
Originally from South Australian National Football League (SANFL) club South Adelaide, Margitich debuted for Melbourne in 1930 and kicked 73 goals, a then club record for most goals in a season. He topped their goalkicking again in 1931 and 1932 and managed 10 goals in a game three times in his career. The most he kicked was 12 against North Melbourne in 1931.

Footnotes

References
 Where is He Now?, The (Adelaide) Advertiser, (Friday, 19 September 1952), p.6.

External links

 
 
 George Margitich, at Demonwiki.
 George Margitich, at Boyles Football Photos.

1908 births
Australian rules footballers from South Australia
Melbourne Football Club players
South Adelaide Football Club players
Swan Districts Football Club coaches
1958 deaths